Ulos is the traditional Tenun fabric of the Batak people of North Sumatra in Indonesia. Different kinds of ulos have different ceremonial significance. The ulos is normally worn draped over the shoulder or shoulders, or in weddings to ceremonially bind the bride and groom together. Ulos are traditionally hand woven and in the case of higher-quality examples are significant family heirlooms, to be worn at important events, such as funerals and weddings. 

With increasing modernisation has come the decline in significance of the ulos, with many varieties no longer in demand.

History

According to the Batak people, there are three sources of warmth for humans; Sun, Fire and Ulos. Why is ulos a source of warmth? Ulos is said to be a source of warmth because they were living on cold mountains. This natural condition makes sunlight insufficient to give warmth especially at night. Then, they created something that is able to give them warmth, also believed to be able to give the men bravery and the women strength against infertility .

At first, Ulos was only used as an ordinary cloth but it later developed to a symbol of love, traditional ceremony requirements, and society structural system symbol. Even today ulos is believed to have magical religious power and is thus considered 'sacred' and has special power to protect the user.

There are many kinds and motifs of ulos, which have their own respective meaning in accordance to the characteristic, condition, function, and some relation. When it is used given to whom, and which traditional ceremony like wedding, birth, death and other rituals will never run without Ulos.
If Ulos is used by a man, the upper part of it is called ande-ande, the lower called singkot, the one used on the head called tali-tali, or bulang-bulang. But, because of its sacred value, not all Ulos can be used in daily activities. Ulos Jugja, Sadum, Ragidup, and Runjat are only used in some occasions. In everyday life, men wear Ulos in box pattern with black shirt named baju Kurung without shoes nor sandals.

Usage

When ulos is used by a female, the bottom is called haen, the back is called hoba-hoba and if it used as sсarf it is called ampe-ampe. If used as head cover it is called saong, and if used to carry baby it is called parompa. In daily life, the females wear a black long dress and head cover.

There are three ways to use Ulos. First, siabithononton, the Ulos used for this are Ragidup, Sibolang, Runjat, Djobit, Simarindjamisi, and Ragi Pangko. Second, sihadanghononton (used as head cover). The Ulos used for this are Sirara, Sumbat, Bolean, Mangiring, Surisuri and Sadum. Third, sitalitalihononton (tied at hip). Ulos used for this are Tumtuman, Mangiring and Padangrusa. Using Ulos in the right way is extremely important to make good looking and also to fulfill the philosophy meaning in Ulos.

Ulos as love symbol is called mangulosi. In Batak culture, mangulosi (giving Ulos) is a symbol of love to the receiver. In mangulosi, there are common rules, mangulosi can only be done by people who have a family relation or to give it to lower social status people. For example, parents can mengulosi their children, but not opposite.
To mangulosi a child who gives birth to their first child, the Ulos given is Ragidup Sinagok. Ulos given to a special guest is Ulos Ragidup Silingo.

Production
Ulos is made with a manual loom machine. A spinner (Sorha) is used to make cotton into yards. Pamanggung is used to tie yards. Pagabe to hold the yard. Baliga, used to organize yards. Hatalungan is used to separate yards. Pamapan used to make the yard into cloth. Palabuan (Periuk tanah) is used to saving coloring water. Ulos made of cotton and the coloring water made of barks, grass, roots, mud or leaves.

See also

 Ikat
 Balinese textiles
 Kebaya
 Batik

References

External links
Collection of Batak Toba ulos
Tempointeraktif - Serat Kehidupan Ulos Batak
Various ulos
Indonesian culture

Batak
Textile industry of Indonesia